Larry Dvoskin is an American musician, songwriter, arranger, producer, professor and entrepreneur. He is best known in the industry as the songwriting partner of The Beach Boys' Al Jardine. The founder of Do What You Love Media, Miracle Music Inc and Cool Guy Music Inc.

Career 
Dvoskin has worked with artists including Robert Plant, Sammy Hagar, Sean Lennon, Bad Company, Robin Zander of Cheap Trick, Joe Lynn Turner, Meredith Brooks, Uli Jon Roth, Zeno, Desmond Child, the Muppets, Annabella Lwin, Paul O’Neill with the Transiberian Orchestra, Beach Boys co-founder Al Jardine, MGMT, and Neal Schon of Journey.

In addition to working with other musicians, Dvoskin also released his single "Life is Strange" which was a Top-20 hit in 2020.

Discography

Teaching 
Dvoskin has worked as a program instructor for New York University’s High School Academy Songwriting Camp.

Philanthropy 
As a response to the COVID-19 pandemic, Dvoskin and Al Jardine teamed up on “Waves of Love 2.0” and “Jenny Clover” in benefit to the World Central Kitchen which provides food to doctors, nurses and other essential front-line workers.

In 2010, Dvoskin performed on a charity single We Are the World 25 for Haiti as part of an initiative to help benefit the people of Hait in the aftermath of the country's most severe earthquake in over 200 years.

References 

Year of birth missing (living people)
Living people
American rock songwriters